Simargl Air provides charter passenger VIP, sightseeing and crop-spraying flights in the Caucasus region of Russia.

Destinations

 Sightseeing flights
 Flying around on a circular route in Nalchik
 Circled area of the Blue Lakes
 Circled area Tyrnyauz
 Circled area Adiyuh Palace (n.p. Habez, KCR) on a circular route
 Circled area Dombai
 Circled area Arkhyz
 Shuttle flights (Excursions)
 Nalchik, Nalchik Chegem waterfalls, without landing
 Nalchik, Nalchik, Blue Lakes, without boarding
 Nalchik, Nalchik Bezengi gorge, without landing
 Nalchik-area Tyrnyauz (rest), Nalchik
 Tyrnyauz-V. Baksana-Tyrnyauz, without landing
 Nalchik, Nalchik V.Baksan, without landing
 Nalchik-Khabazi (CBD), Nalchik, without landing
 Nalchik-Khabez (KCR), Nalchik, landing in Khabez
 Khabez-Dombai (rest 2–3 hours) Khabez
 Khabez-Arkhyz (rest 2–3 hours) Khabez
 Khabez-mineral water-Khabez
 Khabez-Stavropol-Khabez
 Khabez-Nevynomysk-Khabez
 Khabez-Armavir-Khabez
 Nchk-Teberda/Dombay-Nalchik

Fleet

External links

Homepage - https://archive.today/20130417182358/http://www.simargl-air.ru/en

References

Airlines of Russia
Companies based in Stavropol Krai